Boris Itzkovich Escobar (born 22 April 1989), known by the stage name Envy Peru, is a Peruvian drag queen, actor, model and makeup artist settled in the Netherlands, most notable for being the winner of the first season of Drag Race Holland. He is also known as one of the top three drag presenters in the Netherlands for the BNNVARA television show De diva in mij.

Early life
Escobar was born in Trujillo, Peru in 1989. At the age of four, they moved with their mother and aunt to the Netherlands, where they began working in the world of theater and makeup. She is the drag daughter of Vanessa Van Cartier.

Career

On 9 September 2020, Envy Peru was announced as 1 of 10 cast members of the debut season of Drag Race Holland. Envy was the first ever Peruvian contestant in the Drag Race franchise, and went on to win the first season of the show. Her track record was one of the best in the history of the show at the time of airing, with 4 challenge wins out of the 7 competitive episodes.

In July 2021, she was a featured guest judge for Drag Race España, becoming the first Drag Race contestant to act as a guest judge across the whole franchise.

As Envy Peru, she is the most followed drag queen on social media in the Netherlands.

Filmography

Television

Film

Music videos

Webseries

Awards and nominations

References

External links
 

1989 births
Living people
Dutch drag queens
Drag Race Holland winners
Dutch make-up artists
People from Trujillo, Peru
Peruvian emigrants to the Netherlands
Peruvian film actors